"Life Begins at the Hop" is a single by XTC released in 1979 and their fifth single.  Keyboardist Barry Andrews was replaced by second guitarist Dave Gregory prior to its recording. The song title references the 1950s' rock 'n' roll classic "At the Hop".

The song was bassist Colin Moulding's first A-side composition for the group, and the band's first UK chart single, reaching #54.

"Homo Safari", the B-side, was the first in Andy Partridge's "Homo Safari Series", a six-part series of ambient, impressionistic instrumentals, initially released on the b-sides of various XTC 7" and 12" singles.

Track listing
"Life Begins at the Hop" (Colin Moulding) – 3:46
"Homo Safari" (Andy Partridge) – 2:14

Charts

References

1979 singles
XTC songs
Songs written by Colin Moulding